Eisenbach (in its lower course: Hammerbach) is a river of Baden-Württemberg, Germany. It flows into the Breg near Vöhrenbach.

See also
List of rivers of Baden-Württemberg

References

Rivers of Baden-Württemberg
Rivers of the Black Forest
Rivers of Germany